Here Lies Love is a biographical "disco pop" musical, based on the concept music album by David Byrne and Fatboy Slim. The concept album is based on David Byrne's research on the life of former Philippine first lady Imelda Marcos.

Productions
Here Lies Love premiered off Broadway at The Public Theater in New York City in 2013 under the direction of Alex Timbers. It starred Ruthie Ann Miles in the lead role, with Jose Llana as Ferdinand Marcos and Conrad Ricamora as Ninoy Aquino. The production played an extended run at the Public before closing in August 2013. It returned for an open-ended commercial run again at the Public in April 2014. It closed at the Public on January 4, 2015. The production won five Lucille Lortel Awards in 2014.

The musical, directed once again by Timbers, opened at the Royal National Theatre in September 2014, and played a limited, sold-out run through January 2015 at the Royal's newly renovated Dorfman Theatre. The London-based production was nominated for three Olivier Awards in 2015 (Best New Musical, Outstanding Achievement in Music, and Best Theatre Choreographer).

A revamped production from the original Off-Broadway creative team, with the intention of recreating the immersive elements in a proscenium theater, was staged at the Seattle Repertory Theater from April 7 to June 18, 2017 (extended from May 28 after strong ticket sales). Notable returning actors included Conrad Ricamora and Melody Butiu reprising their roles from the original Off-Broadway cast as Ninoy Aquino and Estrella Cumpas, respectively, Mark Bautista from the London cast reprising his role as Ferdinand Marcos, and replacement actor Jaygee Macapugay reprising her role as Imelda Marcos from the Off-Broadway cast.

The production is set to have its Broadway premiere at the Broadway Theatre in summer of 2023, with previews beginning June 17 before an official opening on July 20. Ricamora and Llana will reprise their roles as Ninoy Aquino and Ferdinand Marcos, respectively. Lea Salonga is scheduled to play Aurora Aquino for a five-week run from July 11 to August 13. The production plans to rotate different guest actors from the Philippines in various roles. It is produced by Hal Luftig, Patrick Catullo, Diana DiMenna, Clint Ramos and Jose Antonio Vargas.

Synopsis

Prologue
As clubbers enter Club Millennium, the DJ sets up the party with music and with Imelda Marcos motif. The DJ instructs the clubbers to enjoy the party as they watch the club's staff reenacting the life of Imelda Marcos through the club's music. The club ensemble comes in ("American Troglodyte") and performs.

Act 1
Imelda Romualdez is shown as a poor girl in stormy Leyte ("Here Lies Love") with best friend Estrella. Ninoy Aquino comes on stage and tells of his background ("Child of the Philippines") and his endearment to Imelda. However, Ninoy ("Opposite Attraction") is apprehensive of having to be in a relationship with Imelda due to their differences. While Ninoy wants to be in politics, Imelda shows only a penchant for love and beauty. Imelda eventually joins a beauty pageant ("Rose of Tacloban") around the same time that Ferdinand Marcos is becoming even more famous ("A Perfect Hand"). Soon, Ferdinand and Imelda meet each other and start dating ("Eleven Days") and kiss each other at the end of the number. Afterwards, Ferdinand and Imelda are married in a ceremony while Estrella ("When She Passed By") watches from afar, reminiscing their past. Ferdinand and Imelda ("Sugartime Baby") go on their honeymoon and Imelda decides she should become a perfect wife to the Senator in exchange for Ferdinand pulling her out of poverty ("Walk Like a Woman"). Afterwards, Imelda and Ferdinand ("Don't You Agree? / Pretty Face") start campaigning and ending up winning. 

Now sitting in Malacañang, ("Dancing Together") Imelda has been spearheading lavish parties and celebrations in the palace while under medication - the price she paid for marrying a busy statesman. In response to the parties and construction projects, the now Senator Ninoy Aquino leads ("Fabulous One") the opposition with great rhetoric. Imelda is surprised by this act from Ninoy ("Men Will Do Anything"). Around the same time, Ferdinand enters a romantic affair with Dovie Beams.

Act 2
Imelda shows a fiercer side of herself after the gaffes ("Star and Slave") and vents her anger against a sickly Ferdinand, who asks her for forgiveness ("Poor Me"). Imelda claims she will be the one running the country, now that Ferdinand is sick. The people do not like what is happening to the Philippines ("Please Don't") under Imelda's leadership, but she is continues to do crisis control by showcasing international leaders. 

Estrella does a tell-all interview ("Solano Avenue") which results into a confrontation between her and old friend Imelda, where she offers Estrella money. When Estrella refuses, Imelda has her imprisoned. Due to the growing numbers of riots ("Riots and Bombs") in Manila, Ferdinand declares martial law ("Order 1081") and the ensemble sings of their experiences and suffering. Among them is Ninoy, who grows so vocal he is imprisoned. Imelda visits Ninoy in his cell and tells him he should go to the United States and never come back ("Seven Years"). Ninoy goes to the United States but returns ("Gate 37") only to be assassinated on the tarmac. Ninoy's mother, Aurora ("Just Ask the Flowers") vents about her son's death and encourages the people to revolt. Watching her popularity and support crumble before her, Imelda bemoans her loss as an image of Estrella angrily criticizes her ("Why Don't You Love Me?"). The situation in the Philippines now out of their control, Imelda and Ferdinand are evacuated from the palace by helicopter, bringing their regime to an end.

Epilogue
The actress who played Imelda comes out and introduces the next number. The DJ comes down from his booth and sings about the story of the People Power Revolution while playing his guitar ("God Draws Straight"). The rest of the ensemble returns to do one last song and dance with the clubbers for the curtain call ("Here Lies Love (Reprise)").

Musical numbers

 Act I
 "American Troglodyte"
 "Here Lies Love"
 "Child of the Philippines"
 "Opposite Attraction"
 "The Rose of Tacloban"
 "A Perfect Hand"
 "Eleven Days"
 "When She Passed By"
 "Sugartime Baby"
 "Walk Like a Woman"
 "Don't You Agree? / Pretty Face"
 "Dancing Together"
 "The Fabulous One"
 "Men Will Do Anything"

 Act II
 "Star and Slave"
 "Poor Me"
 "Please Don't"
 "Solano Avenue"
 "Riots and Bombs"
 "Order 1081"
 "Seven Years"
 "Gate 37"
 "Just Ask the Flowers"
 "Why Don't You Love Me?"
 "God Draws Straight"
 "Here Lies Love (Reprise)"

Characters
Imelda Marcos - a provincial girl who became the wife of Senator Ferdinand Marcos; consequently becomes First Lady
Ferdinand Marcos - a dictator. The longest-serving President of the Philippines who puts the Philippines under Martial Law from 1972 - 1981
Ninoy Aquino - a scion of the rich and political Aquino clan, the staunchest leader of the opposition party during the Marcos administration, murdered in what is now known as the Ninoy Aquino International Airport.
Estrella Cumpas - Imelda's best friend and nanny
DJ - encourages the audience to dance and interacts with them throughout the show, revealed to be one of the revolutionaries towards the end who sings "God Draws Straight"

Cast

Awards and nominations

Original Off-Broadway production

Original West End production

Critical response
Generally described as innovative, Here Lies Love challenges tradition by becoming an immersive show that utilizes much audience engagement and inventive set design that transforms theatre into a disco ballroom adorned by horizontal screens and neon accents.

Alice Kaderlan writes "rarely has a show that gets this much advance PR met my expectations, but I was totally captivated from the production’s opening moments. The story is a little slim and there are no great insights about Imelda but the infectious, pulsating music (by Byrne and Fatboy Slim) and dazzling production design make for a snappy, nonstop 90 minutes.

Jeffrey Hannan says, "Narrative structure and character development are inviolable necessities in good theatre and Here Lies Love doesn't cheat in that regard. Despite any preconceived notions of Imelda Marcos you may harbor upon arrival, as the 90 minute event unfolds, you are demanded to see this as a story not of the somewhat laughable icon presented by American media but of a woman. And her husband. And his rival. And other core characters who give humanity to the terrible as well as tabloid headlines."

Vulture's Jesse Green stated that while it is an accumulation of static disco songs, "something wonderful is also going on."

Criticism
Not all reviews were positive. Actress Sara Porkalob characterizes the production as having "failed to realize that Imelda was a formidable political figure in her own right. She was a crucial and knowing player in her husband's domestic and foreign policies and was not fashionable innocent, formed only by the men in her life, as the play makes her out to be".

Accusations that the show glamorizes the Marcos regime were raised following the announcement of the musical's Broadway transfer in 2023, particularly in light of the Marcos family's return to power in the Philippines with Bongbong Marcos' election in 2022. The producers issued a statement in response emphasizing that they viewed the show as anti-Marcos and pro-Philippines, noting, "History repeats itself. Democracies all over the world are under threat. The biggest threat to any democracy is disinformation, Here Lies Love offers a creative way of re-information — an innovative template on how to stand up to tyrant. We cannot tell the modern history of the Philippines without the United States. They’re intertwined".

References

External links
 Here Lies Love cast
 Here Lies Love original cast recording
 "Here Lies Love Revival traces Rise, Fall of Philippines' Infamous First Lady"

2013 musicals
Biographical musicals
Musicals
Plays set in the 20th century
Plays set in the Philippines
Rock musicals